Mount Press is a peak rising to  in the north-central Sentinel Range in Ellsworth Mountains, Antarctica.  It is linked to Eyer Peak by Zvegor Saddle, and surmounts Embree Glacier to the north and Ellen Glacier to the southeast. Mount Press is the summit of Probuda Ridge, and was first ascended by the American Jed Brown and the Chileans Camilo Rada and Maria Paz 'Pachi' Ibarra on 31 December 2006.

The peak is named for Frank Press, vice chairman of the technical panel on glaciology of the U.S. National Committee for the IGY; later (1977- ) White House Science Advisor.

Location
Mapped by the Marie Byrd Land Traverse Party (1957–58) led by Charles R. Bentley, updated US mapping in 1988 and by Gildea (by GPS) in 2006.

See also
 Mountains in Antarctica

Maps
 Vinson Massif.  Scale 1:250 000 topographic map.  Reston, Virginia: US Geological Survey, 1988.
 D. Gildea and C. Rada.  Vinson Massif and the Sentinel Range.  Scale 1:50 000 topographic map.  Omega Foundation, 2007.
 Antarctic Digital Database (ADD). Scale 1:250000 topographic map of Antarctica. Scientific Committee on Antarctic Research (SCAR). Since 1993, regularly updated.

References

External links 
 
 SCAR Composite Antarctic Gazetteer.
 Mount Press. Copernix satellite image
 Damien Gildea, "Expeditions".

Ellsworth Mountains
Mountains of Ellsworth Land